Tom Ale (born 1 April 1999) is a professional rugby league footballer who plays , , and  for the New Zealand Warriors in the NRL.

Career

2020
Ale made his first grade debut in round 19 of the 2020 NRL season for the New Zealand Warriors against the Canberra Raiders.

References

External links
Warriors profile

1999 births
Living people
New Zealand rugby league players
New Zealand Warriors players
Rugby league players from Auckland
Rugby league props